Fireman Sam was first broadcast on BBC One on . There are 239 episodes which span thirteen series, four movies and live-action production. Twenty-six VHS tapes were made from 1988 to 2005 comprising all episodes from series 1 to 4, and some from series 5. There are a number of DVDs available which contain all the series. Though it is advertised as complete, the series 1–4 DVD set is missing the episode "Snow Business". The series two episode "Snow Business" is on a separate DVD. Episodes from series five through eight are available on DVD but some episodes are missing.

Starting with series six, HIT Entertainment abandoned the stop motion animation for computer-generated imagery (CGI) animation and changed the location of Pontypandy from the hills of Wales to the Welsh coastal area.

Series overview

Original series (1987–1994)
The original series consisted of 32 ten-minute episodes and a 20-minute Christmas special. The narration and all the character voices were done by John Alderton.

Fireman Sam is the main character and interacts with both colleagues at the fire station and fellow villagers. Despite being so small, and with so little activity, the village sees its fair share of fires, which Sam and his team can easily handle. The vehicles at the fire station include a four-wheeled Bedford TK fire engine called Jupiter, a six-wheeled 1982 Range Rover Rescue Tender named Venus, and Trevor's Bus, a 1985 Ford Transit Dormobile. Fireman Sam's colleagues are Elvis Cridlington, Station Officer Basil Steele (renamed Norris Steele in the new CGI series) and later Penny Morris (who hailed from Newtown with the fire tender). The villagers are bus driver/auxiliary firefighter Trevor Evans, Italian café owner Bella Lasagne, troublemaker Norman Price, Norman's single mother Dilys Price, and the twins Sarah and James Jones. The objects include M.O.P., Bentley the Robot, and Mechanical Master Chef.

When it was launched in 1987, the original series aired on S4C, on BBC One, during Children's BBC timeslots. In 1988, the original series was nominated for a BAFTA Award for the Best Short Animated Film. The potential recipients were Ian Frampton and John Walker.

In November 2020, the full series (plus Series 5) was made available on BBC iPlayer.

Series 1 (1987)

Series 2 (1988)

Series 3 (1990)
Both the English and Welsh language versions of these episodes aired in 1990.

Series 4 (1994)
Both the English and Welsh language versions of these episodes aired in 1994.

Revival series (2005–present)

Series 5 (2005)
In December 2001, Gullane Entertainment announced they had purchased a 50% stake in the Fireman Sam property from S4C, with the intention of remastering the earlier episodes and producing a new series of twenty-six episodes, ten minutes in length like with the classic series. Gullane was soon purchased by HIT Entertainment in October 2002, bringing the Fireman Sam rights to them. On October 25, it was announced that the series would be animated by Siriol Productions, a subsidiary of Entertainment Rights, and that the episodes would be delivered to S4C and the BBC for a 2004 delivery.

These episodes used more modern techniques of stop motion claymation including mouths that move with the dialogue. This series featured all the original characters, but also introduced some new faces, such as Tom Thomas, the Australian pilot of the rescue helicopter Wallaby One and the Mountain Rescue 4×4 Jeep, an unnamed photographer/news reporter, and the Flood family; consisting of Mike the Plumber, his wife Helen the Nurse, and their daughter Mandy. Though still loosely based on a Bedford TK, the updated Jupiter has six wheels, with a slightly revised livery and appearance. Venus also received an update, with its design sporting a more generic modern appearance, though not based on any real-life model in particular. The main characters in this series were voiced by John Sparkes, Joanna Ruiz and Sarah Hadland.

Series 6 (2008–09)
On 22 March 2007, S4C announced they had sold their 50% share in Fireman Sam to HIT Entertainment. On the same day, the broadcaster announced that development for a sixth series was underway with a DVD special and a 60-minute special, the latter of which would be sold for a 2009 delivery. Despite the sellout, S4C would continue to remain on board as an executive producer for the new series and would retain all Welsh-language rights to the property. On September 7, it was announced that Series 6 would be animated in CGI animation and in high-definition, with HIT announcing Hibbert Ralph Animation as producer and Chinese-based Xing-Xing outsourcing the animation. The production of the new series would be scheduled for a May 2008 delivery, with production occurring until January 2009. On 25 October, HIT announced that the first CGI season would be produced as two series, making up Series 6 and 7. The BBC, who broadcast the first five series, would lose the rights to air the series, with Cartoonito acquiring UK pay-TV rights to both series, alongside Series 5, while Five acquired the rights to the first four series.

The first five episodes of Series 6 were first released direct-to-DVD in November 2008 as an introduction to the new series, with Series 6's TV debut on Cartoonito occurring in February 2009. The British Terrestrial rights to Series 6 and 7 were purchased by GMTV in July 2009 for airing in the Autumn on the stand's The Fluffy Club block.

The CGI transition brought along a complete revamp of the series, with Pontypandy becoming a seaside fishing village instead of a village set deep in the hills, though the main locations remained in the same places. The season also saw the introduction of three new characters - the parents of Sarah and James - new-age mother Bronwyn, and fisherman father Charlie, who is Sam's brother, and Derek Price, Norman's cousin. New animals introduced were Lion, a cat owned by Charlie and Bronwyn, Radar, a rescue dog from the Fire Station, and Nipper, an energetic dog who belongs to Bronwyn's sister that the former looks after. The voice cast was also replaced, with the new voice actors for the series being Steven Kynman, Tegwen Tucker, David Carling and Su Douglas.

A new location - the 'Whole Fish Café' was added, which functions similarly to Bella's cafe from past series and is run by Charlie and Bronwyn, also functioning as their home. The Fire Station is refreshed with a double-door design, allowing for Jupiter and Venus to exit at the same time, as well as it becoming multi-floored. Dilys' shop was also turned from a simple corner store into a 7-Eleven-esque convenience store called the "Cut-Price-Supermarket".

New vehicles introduced were Neptune, a lifeboat which is normally piloted by Penny, and a green work van owned by Mike Flood. Some vehicles also received makeovers as well: Jupiter was updated with a front end taken from a Volvo FL6 and a yellow stripe was added to the front of the engine. Venus gains a water nozzle on its roof, and Trevor's bus was updated to be more modern with angled headlights.

The character's outfits were updated throughout the series (except for Norman Price), which included an update to the firefighter's outfits which added reflective stripes and extra badges to their tunics. Existing characters have had makeovers as well, Penny gains an extra bow and is now a qualified Coast Guard, normally piloting Neptune in ocean emergencies, and Dilys Price received a large makeover which saw her getting makeup, glasses, black hair, a necklace and an updated outfit. Bella Lasagne was removed from the series, although her Cafe is still seen opposite Dilys' shop. Rosa (Lasagne's cat) was also removed, alongside Dusty the dog.

With the revamp and going onwards to this day, many of the characters also had aspects of their personalities made more apparent. Norman Price is far more mischievous and inconsiderate than in the 2005 series where his pranks were often planned out and his accidents were due to badly planned ideas instead of outrageous schemes. For example, in the episode "Pontypandy Extreme", Norman gets trapped down a wishing well after attempting to climb down in order to retrieve the coins from the bottom. Other examples are Station Officer Steele's strictness and maturity and Elvis's decrease in general competence. For example, in one episode where a first aid training exercise is taking place, Elvis is told off by Steele for dancing with the dummy that is being used. At the same time, Steele is not afraid to unleash the child within him, showing an interest in kite flying and paper planes. He also occasionally causes emergencies himself and often gasps when an emergency comes in. Also, Station Officer Steele's name has changed to Station Officer Norris Steele.

Series 7 (2009)

The Great Fire of Pondypandy (2010)

The franchise's first 60-minute movie - The Great Fire of Pontypandy was released straight to DVD in March 2010, and introduced a new character - Chief Fire Officer Boyce, a Chief Officer who hails from Newtown, and a new location - the Lighthouse.

Series 8 (2012)
On 22 February 2011, HIT announced an eighth Series of Fireman Sam for a 2012 delivery consisting of 26 10-minute episodes, as with the previous two series. Xing-Xing Animation fully took over control of the animation production, with the series now being fully produced in HD.

Series 8 introduced a new environment - the Pontypandy Heritage Railway, which lines up to the base of Pontypandy Mountain and is run by new character Gareth Griffiths, who is Bronwyn's Dad. A new location near Pontypandy Mountain, the Mountain Activity Centre is introduced, ran by Moose Roberts, a famous mountain climber hailing from Canada. Mrs. Chen, a schoolteacher, and her daughter Lily Chen, the youngest character in the series so far were also introduced in the series.

Three new vehicles were introduced - the Pontypandy Flyer Train, Mercury, a quad-bike, and Bessie, a rail-based fire engine that was Station Officer Steele's first fire engine when he was younger, which lives in a shed near the Train Station. A quat-copter drone called Saturn was also introduced.

Voice actors joining the cast were John Hasler, who replaced Steven Kynman as the voice of James, Ifan Huw Dafydd, who voiced Gareth, and Nigel Whitmey, who voiced Moose.

On August 31, 2012, it was announced that Channel 5 had acquired the terrestrial broadcast rights to the series to air on the channel's Milkshake! strand from October.

Series 9 (2014)
In March 2013, a ninth season was announced which was pre-sold to Cartoonito for a 2014 release. Series 9 features 24 10-minute episodes, alongside a 22-minute special.

The main location added for this series was the new Ocean Rescue Centre, run by new character Ben Hooper, who is a coastguard. Alongside housing Neptune, which was updated to feature a proper siren, two new water-based vehicles were introduced: a jet ski named Juno and a fire boat named Titan. Other locations added were Pontypandy Island, and the Garage, ran by Joe Sparkes, a mechanic and inventor who is as problematic and accident-prone as Mike Flood is. Joe's wife Lizzie Sparkes, a vet, and their daughter Hannah Sparkes, who is the first disabled character in the series, were introduced as well.

Voice actors joining the cast were Alex Lowe, who voices Ben and Joe, and Jo Wyatt, who voices Lizzie and Hannah.

Ultimate Heroes/Heroes of the Storm (2014/2015)
On October 2, 2013, HIT greenlit several DVD specials of their properties, including a new Fireman Sam''' special for a 2015 release titled Heroes of the Storm. The special introduces a brand new Fire Station, alongside two new firefighters - Ellie Phillips and Arnold McKinley.

The special was first shown in the United States in November 2014, under the name of Ultimate Heroes, as an introduction to the series in the country. and later was shown in the United Kingdom in 2015.

Series 10 (2016)
Series 10 saw some changes, with the Firefighters now wearing outer gear when not in emergencies, and different kinds of uniform for different emergencies.

New characters introduced were Jerry Lee Cridlington, Elvis' cousin who works as a Firefighter in Newtown, Professor Pickles, the owner of the Newtown Museum, and Lady Pufflepaws, a Dog belonging to Norman's unseen Auntie Phyllis. Bella Lasague makes her CGI debut, after last being seen in Series 5. Pontypandy Park makes its first appearance in CGI as well, being upgraded with a Pizza restaurant and a swimming pool.

Alien Alert (2016)
In April 2016, Mattel announced a new Fireman Sam special for a May 2017 delivery to coincide with the franchise's 30th anniversary.

The series features a guest character Buck Douglas, voiced by David Tennant, who is the presenter for the famous "Alien Quest" TV show host, and visits Pontypandy to try and find aliens.

Season 11 (2017–18)
On 14 October 2016, Mattel Creations and DHX Media announced that an eleventh series was greenlit for a 2018 delivery.

This is the first series to have its animation production done by DHX Studios Halifax as part of a new co-production deal between both companies. This is also the first CGI season to only feature 13 episodes instead of the usual 26.

The only new characters introduced in this season are the royal Prince and Princess, and their son.

Set for Action! (2018)
On the same day as the production for Series 11 was announced, a new Fireman Sam special was also announced for a 2018 delivery.

The special focuses on Pondypandy being the setting for an action-packed movie, and features two guest characters - Don Sledgehammer, a film director, and Flex Dexter, a disliked actor who is jealous of Fireman Sam being the main star of the movie and attempts to get him fired so he can take over.

Series 12 (2020–21)
On September 30, 2019, WildBrain and Mattel Television announced that a twelfth series was greenlit for a Summer 2020 delivery.

The series introduces Pontypandy's first Police Officer to the cast - PC Malcolm Williams, who is Helen Flood's brother. Colin McFarlane joined the voice cast, voicing Malcolm.

 Norman Price and the Mystery in the Sky (2020)
On the same day as the announcement of Series 12, another special was also announced for a 2020 delivery, tentatively titled The Rise of Norman-Man before gaining its final name.

The special focuses on two guest characters - Professor Polonium and Dr. Crumpton, who want to steal a super battery in order to create their own jetpack for fame and power.

 Series 13 (2021–22) 
In October 2020, a thirteenth series of Fireman Sam was greenlit by WildBrain and Mattel Television for a June 2021 release and delivery window. This is the first series since the tenth to feature twenty-six episodes.

Series 14 (2022–23)
WildBrain announced a fourteenth series on 13 October 2022. The series premiered on 1 November 2022.

Series 15 (2023)
A fifteenth series was announced at the same time as Series 14.

Live performances
Fireman Sam in Action
Fireman Sam on Stage

Home media releases

VHS
Most of the original episodes have been made available on VHS previously (in the United Kingdom by BBC Video in 1988–2001 and in the United States and Canada by Family Home Entertainment), but apart from a VHS version of Action Stations'', these are all now out of print. It has been available on DVD by Hit Entertainment in the United Kingdom from 2004 to 2016 and Abbey Home Media from 2017 onward due to a pact with DHX Media (Later WildBrain). Here is a list of the UK releases.

DVD

Region 2 UK
The entire classic series was released on DVD in April 2007. Prior to that, only two other DVDs were available: "Action Stations", containing 12 classic series episodes, and "Snow Business", containing the Christmas special (which was noticeably absent in the classic series boxed set) and two other episodes: "Safe with Sam", which emphasizes fire safety and which has not been shown by the BBC since November 1990, and "Rich and Famous". A further DVD of original episodes was available from the newspaper The Sunday Mirror in 2006, but only contained two episodes. The majority of the 2005 season has been released in several DVD's.

Broadcast release DVDs
Note that in several cases, titles have been reused in VHS and DVD releases with quite different content.

Selection / Best-of DVDs

Compilation DVDs
The following is a list of compilation DVDs that include fireman episodes as well as other shows.

Region 1 US
Complete series have not been released in the US on DVD.
Some complete series were released online in the US (e.g., Series 7 was released on iTunes as "Season 6").

Note that in several cases, DVD titles have been reused in the US and UK releases with quite different content.

References

Fireman Sam
Lists of British children's television series episodes
Lists of British animated television series episodes